Chuping is a state constituency in Perlis, Malaysia, that has been represented in the Perlis State Legislative Assembly from 1974 to 1986 and from 1995 to present.

The state constituency was first contested in 1986 and is mandated to return a single Assemblyman to the Perlis State Legislative Assembly under the first-past-the-post voting system. , the State Assemblyman for Chuping is Asmaiza Ahmad  from Barisan Nasional (BN).

Definition

Polling districts 
According to the federal gazette issued on 31 October 2022, the Chuping constituency is divided into 6 polling districts.

Demographics

History

Election results

References

Perlis state constituencies